The electoral district of Hobart was a multi-member electoral district of the Tasmanian House of Assembly. It was based in Tasmania's capital city, Hobart.

It was created at the 1897 election under a trial of the Hare-Clark electoral model along with the seat of Electoral district of Launceston. It continued for two terms, before being broken up again in 1903 into Central, East, North, South and West Hobart. In 1909, the entire state adopted Hare-Clark, and the Hobart region became part of the Denison division.

Members for Hobart

References
 
 
 Parliament of Tasmania (2006). The Parliament of Tasmania from 1956

Hobart